Dawn Hastings-Williams is a Guyanese politician.  She has been a member of the National Assembly since 2011.  She has previously served as Minister within the Ministry of Communities (2015-2017), Minister of Public Affairs (2017-2019), and Minister of State (2019-2020).

Early life 
Hastings was born in an Akawaio village, Kako, located in the Cuyuni-Mazaruni region (Region 7).  She attended the local primary school, then later received a Hinterland Scholarship to study at the Central High School in Georgetown.  However, Hastings had to leave school in fourth form when her mother died.  At age 17, she was able to resume her education: she entered Cyril Potter College of Education and completed a Certificate in Education (Primary).  She then graduated from the University of Guyana with a Bachelor's degree in Education Administration.   After graduation, she returned to her village and became the school headmistress.

Politics 
Hastings was nominated as a candidate of the People's National Congress (PNC) in February 2010.  She was elected to the National Assembly for the PNC's APNU alliance in the 2011 general election, where she won a seat for the Geographic Constituency of Region 7.

Hastings was re-elected in the 2015 general election.  In the APNU-AFC government, she served in several cabinet positions: Minister within the Ministry of Communities (2015-2017), Minister of Public Affairs (2017-2019), and Minister of State (2019-2020).  She was the first indigenous Minister of State.

Hastings was appointed as a Principal Political Secretary of the PNC in 2017.  She was elected again in the 2020 general election.

References 

Living people
Members of the National Assembly (Guyana)
Government ministers of Guyana
Women government ministers of Guyana
People's National Congress (Guyana) politicians
Guyanese people of indigenous peoples descent
People from Cuyuni-Mazaruni
University of Guyana alumni
Indigenous politicians of the Americas
21st-century women politicians
Year of birth missing (living people)
21st-century Guyanese politicians